Sigebert (which means roughly "magnificent victory"), also spelled Sigibert, Sigobert, Sigeberht, or Siegeberht, is the name of:

Frankish and Anglo-Saxon kings 
 Sigobert the Lame (died c. 509), a king of the Franks
 Sigebert I, King of Austrasia (reigned 561–575)
 Sigebert II, King of Austrasia and Burgundy (reigned 613)
 Sigebert III, King of Austrasia (reigned 634–656)
 Sigeberht the Little, King of Essex (reigned 623?–653)
 Sigeberht the Good, a king of Essex (reigned c. 653–660)
 Sigeberht of East Anglia, saint and a king of the East Angles (reigned c. 629–c. 634)
 Sigeberht of Wessex, King of Wessex (reigned 756–757)

Others 
 Sigebert of Gembloux (c. 1030–1112), Belgian medieval author and historian
 Sigebert Buckley (c. 1520–probably 1610), Benedictine monk in England
 Sigebert IV, fictitious son of the Merovingian king Dagobert II

See also
Siegbert

Old English given names